The SGB Championship Pairs Championship formerly the Premier League Pairs Championship (from 1997 to 2016) is a motorcycle speedway contest for the second tier teams in the SGB Championship in the United Kingdom. The teams consist of the top two riders from each club competing. The meetings comprise ten teams of two riders drawn into two qualifying groups.

Rules

Gate positions 
In the Qualification Heats, riders are allocated starting gates. For the Semi-Finals, the group winners have first choice of gate positions (A&C or B&D). Gate A is on the inside of the track, whilst Gate D is on the outside. For the Final, the gate positions (A&C and B&D) are decided by the toss of a coin.

Points scoring
All heats are scored as follows:
1st = 4pts
2nd = 3pts
3rd = 2pts
4th = 0pts

This system is used to encourage team riding. A pair finishing first and second will score seven points, whereas a pair finishing first and last will score only four. Race points scored over all Qualification Heats are used to determine the final group placings.

Ties
Where two are tied for a place, the team who scored most points scored in the heat where they met go through. Where more than two teams are tied for a place, the tie is resolved as follows:
Most wins
Most second places
A ballot

Winners

See also
 List of United Kingdom Speedway Pairs champions
 Speedway in the United Kingdom
 Elite League Pairs Championship

References

Oakes, Peter (2013) 2013 British Speedway Yearbook, Frontpage Books, p. 158
"Pairs Championship for Somerset", speedway365.com, 1 June 2013. Retrieved 1 June 2013

Speedway competitions in the United Kingdom